José Higueras (born 1 March 1953) is a tennis coach and former professional tennis player from Spain.

Between 1976 and 1984, Higueras won 16 top-level singles titles. A semi-finalist at the French Open in 1982 and 1983, he reached a career-high singles ranking of world No. 6 in 1983. He was also a member of the Spanish team which won the inaugural World Team Cup in 1978.

Higueras retired from the professional tour in 1986. After retiring as a player, he became a successful tennis coach. He helped coach Michael Chang to the 1989 French Open title, and later, along with Brad Stine, coached Jim Courier to help him reach the world No. 1 singles ranking in 1992, as well as coaching Courier to two French Open titles (1991 and 1992) and two Australian Open titles (1992 and 1993).  Higueras has also coached Todd Martin, Sergi Bruguera, Carlos Moyá, Pete Sampras, Dmitry Tursunov, Guillermo Coria, Robby Ginepri, Roger Federer and Shahar Pe'er, and created the José Higueras Tennis Training Center in Palm Springs, California, where he resides.

In 2008, already the coach of Robby Ginepri, Higueras was hired by Roger Federer to help him through the clay court season. The partnership was extended during the grass court and hard court season. Higueras was chosen to become the director of coaching for elite player development at the United States Tennis Association (USTA) in September 2008.

Career finals

Singles (16 titles, 12 runner-ups)

Doubles (3 titles, 2 runner-ups)

References

External links
 
 
 
 

1953 births
Living people
Sportspeople from the Province of Granada
Spanish expatriate sportspeople in the United States
Spanish male tennis players
Spanish tennis coaches
Tennis players from Andalusia